The Lone Star School was a historic one-room schoolhouse building in rural eastern Arkansas, United States.  It was located southeast of Bald Knob, near the junction of Lone Star and Stokes Roads.  It was a single story wood-frame structure, with a gable roof, novelty siding, and a foundation of brick piers.  It had an interior brick chimney, and its classroom was finished in beaded wooden boards.  Built in the 1920s, it was a rare example of a period rural schoolhouse in the county.

The building was listed on the National Register of Historic Places in 1992.  It has been listed as destroyed in the Arkansas Historic Preservation Program database.

See also
National Register of Historic Places listings in White County, Arkansas

References

School buildings on the National Register of Historic Places in Arkansas
One-room schoolhouses in Arkansas
School buildings completed in 1920
Schools in White County, Arkansas
National Register of Historic Places in White County, Arkansas
1920 establishments in Arkansas
Former buildings and structures in Arkansas